Yuexi County, is a county in the southwest of Anhui Province, People's Republic of China, bordering Hubei Province to the west. It is under the jurisdiction of the prefecture-level city of Anqing. The government of Yuexi County is located in Tiantang Town.

Administrative divisions
Yuexi County has jurisdiction over thirteen towns and eleven townships.

Towns:
Tiantang, Dianqian, Laipang, Changpu, Toutuo, Baimao, Wenquan, Xiangchang, Hetu, Wuhe, Zhubu, Yexi, Huangwei

Townships:
Lianyun Township, Qingtian Township, Baojia Township, Gufang Township, Tiantou Township, Zhongguan Township, Shiguan Township, Yaohe Township, Heping Township, Yuexi County, Weiling Township, Maojianshan Township

Climate

Transport
China National Highway 318

References

 
County-level divisions of Anhui
Anqing